A guilty pleasure is something, such as a film, a television program, a piece of music, or an activity, that one enjoys despite understanding that it is not generally held in high regard, or is seen as unusual or weird. For example, a person may secretly like a film but will admit that particular film is poorly made and/or generally seen as "not good". 

It can also be used to refer to one's taste for foods that are considered to be advisable to avoid, especially for health reasons. For example, coffee, or smoking are considered by many to be guilty pleasures.

See also 
 Escapism
 Guilt
 Hedonism
 Idiosyncrasy
 Personal distress
 Pleasure
 Shame
 Self-deprecation
 Social awkwardness
 Toxic positivity
 Vicarious embarrassment

References

External links 

Conformity
Guilt
Morality
Social influence